Li Pin  (818–876) was a late Tang Dynasty poet. One of Li Pin's poems was collected in the popular anthology Three Hundred Tang Poems.

Poetry
Li Pin's poem "Crossing the Han River" is described by Kenneth Rexroth as "one of the most perfect poems of the later T'ang".

 Crossing the Han River

 Away from home, I was longing for news
 Winter after winter, spring after spring.
 Now, nearing my village, meeting people,
 I dare not ask a single question.

Translation by Witter Bynner.

Notes

References
Rexroth, Kenneth (1970). Love and the Turning Year: One Hundred More Poems from the Chinese. New York: New Directions.

External links 
 
Books of the Quan Tangshi that include collected poems of Li Pin at the Chinese Text Project:
Book 592
Book 593

Three Hundred Tang Poems poets
Writers from Hangzhou
9th-century Chinese poets
Poets from Zhejiang